The Altmühl is a river in Bavaria, Germany.

Course

The source of the Altmühl is close to the town of Ansbach. After leaving Gunzenhausen the river describes a broad curve through the Franconian Jura.

The Altmühl passes the towns of Treuchtlingen, Eichstätt and Beilngries.

Downriver of Dietfurt the river bed was straightened and integrated into a canal connecting the river Main and the river Danube (the Rhine–Main–Danube Canal). In spite of protests by conservationists the canal was opened in 1992 and has changed much of the eastern Altmühl valley.

The Altmühl finally flows into the Danube in Kelheim.

River 

The Altmühl rises on the southern slope of the Franconian Ridge northeast of Rothenburg ob der Tauber, near the Hohe Leite and about 500m southeast of the Burgbernheim wilderness Wildbad. As its source, the Royal Bavarian Hydrotechnical Bureau at Munich in 1904 fixed the drainage ditch of Hornauer Weiher. This is fed by some streams; in the meantime the source of one of them is regarded as Altmühl origin. The Altmühl therefore rises just south of the major European watershed and then flows mainly in southeastern direction. It is the slowest river in Bavaria, flows very slowly, is even one of the slowest German rivers and is also the longest river that rises and flows in the same German state.

The Altmühl can be divided into three parts.

In the upper third, it is a meadow river slowly flowing in a broad valley. The landscape is flat, slightly hilly and the ground consists mainly of rocks of the Keuper period, here mainly limestone and clay. The mudstone seals the subsoil, therefore, the Altmühl in the upper reaches of a not too broad stream.

In its middle course flows the Altmühl in the north and east on Altmühlsee at Gunzenhausen over. The riverbed was rebuilt here during the construction of the Altmühlsee in the 1980s. On the southern shore of the Altmühlsee, the course of the river crosses the Altmühlüberleiter underground .

Only at times of high water discharge does water flow from the Altmühl over the Altmühlzuleiter into the Altmühlsee, which was created as a reservoir to divert water from the Altmühl to the drier river system of the Regnitz. This lake is designated as a bird and nature reserve. The water taken from the lake flows through a tunnel to  the Brombach reservoirs, drained by the Brombach (Regnitz basin), north of the continental divide. The water of the Regnitz flows finally over the Main into the Rhine, so that with the transfer an artificial river bifurcation was created.

From Treuchtlingen the Altmühl flows in its lower course through the Franconian Jura plateau, in whose karst limestone it has dug a narrow valley. On the steep valley slopes here sometimes bizarre rock formations, for instance the cauldron shaped washouts near the village Eßlingen, about 20m above the river level.

From Dollnstein the Jura Breakthrough Valley suddenly becomes much wider. From here the Altmühl flows through an earlier valley of the larger Danube. At Rennertshofen this "Urdonautal" branches off from the present Danube valley; in the section where not the Altmühl flows in it, but only small brooks, it is called Wellheim dry valley.

From the year 1910 the course of the river downstream from Unterwurmbach was straightened and regulated with numerous weirs, hence many oxbow lakes were cut off. Since then, some of the regulatory measures have been reversed, for instance near Treuchtlingen-Graben and shortly before Eichstätt at Wasserzell.

Its lowermost course from Dietfurt was expanded in the middle of the 19th century with 10 locks to become a part of the Ludwig-Danube-Main Canal. The same route was used from 1975 to 1991 for the construction of the Rhine–Main–Danube Canal, a major shipping route with locks in Riedenburg and Kelheim. For the first time in a waterway construction project in Europe, landscaping plans for ecological measures were set up in order to replace nature and landscape interventions; 15% of the canal construction costs were spent on this. The Altmühl flows into the Danube below Kelheim at Danube kilometers 2411.54. The about 34 kilometers long Altmühl section is included in the federal waterway Main-Danube Canal; In addition, the 580 meters of Altmühl above the weir Dietfurt to the MDK are a federal waterway.

Along the Altmühl runs the well-marked and quite well furnished Altmühltalradweg. Canoeing can be done safely on the river itself.

See also
Altmühltal
Arzberg (Altmühl valley)

References

External links

 
Rivers of Bavaria
Federal waterways in Germany
Rivers of Germany